opened in Kirishima, Kagoshima Prefecture, Japan, in 1983. The collection of some three thousand works is exhibited in six buildings: the first, with works by Japanese artists associated with Kagoshima Prefecture, in particular Kuroda Seiki, Fujishima Takeji, and Wada Eisaku, as well as western artists including Monet, Renoir, Degas, and Picasso; the second for installation art; the third, antiquities; the fourth, kakejiku; the fifth, masks, including those used in kagura; and the sixth, Satsuma ware, works by the Museum's first director , and a gallery space for contemporary artists.

See also
 Kagoshima City Museum of Art
 List of Cultural Properties of Japan - paintings (Kagoshima)

References

External links
  Matsushita Museum of Art
  Matsushita Museum of Art

Museums in Kagoshima Prefecture
Kirishima, Kagoshima
Art museums and galleries in Japan
Museums established in 1983
1983 establishments in Japan